San Ildefonso is a municipality in the San Vicente department of El Salvador.

Municipalities of the San Vicente Department